The 1931 Cal Poly Mustangs football team represented California Polytechnic School—now known as California Polytechnic State University, San Luis Obispo—as an independent during the 1931 college football season. Led by tenth-year head coach Al Agosti, Cal Poly compiled a record of 3–5–1. The team was outscored by its opponents 152 to 51 for the season. The Mustangs played home games in San Luis Obispo, California.

Cal Poly was a two-year school until 1941 and competed as an independent from 1929 to 1945. The Mustangs did not field a team in 1930 due to the polio epidemic.

Schedule

Notes

References

Cal Poly
Cal Poly Mustangs football seasons
Cal Poly Mustangs football